In fracture mechanics, the energy release rate, is the rate at which energy is transformed as a material undergoes fracture. Mathematically, the energy release rate is expressed as the decrease in total potential energy per increase in fracture surface area, and is thus expressed in terms of energy per unit area. Various energy balances can be constructed relating the energy released during fracture to the energy of the resulting new surface, as well as other dissipative processes such as plasticity and heat generation. The energy release rate is central to the field of fracture mechanics when solving problems and estimating material properties related to fracture and fatigue.

Definition 

 

where the total potential energy is written in terms of the total strain energy , surface traction , displacement , and body force  by

 

The first integral is over the surface  of the material, and the second over its volume .

The figure on the right shows the plot of an external force  vs. the load-point displacement , in which the area under the curve is the strain energy. The white area between the curve and the -axis is referred to as the complementary energy. In the case of a linearly-elastic material,  is a straight line and the strain energy is equal to the complementary energy.

Prescribed displacement 
In the case of prescribed displacement, the strain energy can be expressed in terms of the specified displacement and the crack surface , and the change in this strain energy is only affected by the change in fracture surface area: . Correspondingly, the energy release rate in this case is expressed as 

 

Prescribed loads 
The energy release rate is then computed as 

 

If the material is linearly-elastic, then  and one may instead write

G in two-dimensional cases
In the cases of two-dimensional problems, the change in crack growth area is simply the change in crack length times the thickness of the specimen. Namely, . Therefore, the equation for computing  can be modified for the 2D case: 
 Prescribed Displacement: 
 Prescribed Load: 
 Prescribed Load, Linear Elastic: 
One can refer to the example calculations embedded in the next section for further information. Sometimes, the strain energy is written using , an energy-per-unit thickness. This gives
 Prescribed Displacement: 
 Prescribed Load: 
 Prescribed Load, Linear Elastic:

Relation to stress intensity factors 
The energy release rate is directly related to the stress intensity factor associated with a given two-dimensional loading mode (Mode-I, Mode-II, or Mode-III) when the crack grows straight ahead. This is applicable to cracks under plane stress, plane strain, and antiplane shear.

For Mode-I, the energy release rate  rate is related to the Mode-I stress intensity factor  for a linearly-elastic material by

where  is related to Young's modulus  and Poisson's ratio  depending on whether the material is under plane stress or plane strain:

For Mode-II, the energy release rate is similarly written as

For Mode-III (antiplane shear), the energy release rate now is a function of the shear modulus ,

For an arbitrary combination of all loading modes, these linear elastic solutions may be superposed as

Relation to fracture toughness 

Crack growth is initiated when the energy release rate over comes a critical value , which is a material property,

Under Mode-I loading, the critical energy release rate  is then related to the Mode-I fracture toughness , another material property, by

Calculating G 
There are a variety of methods available for calculating the energy release rate given material properties, specimen geometry, and loading conditions. Some are dependent on certain criteria being satisfied, such as the material being entirely elastic or even linearly-elastic, and/or that the crack must grow straight ahead. The only method presented that works arbitrarily is that using the total potential energy. If two methods are both applicable, they should yield identical energy release rates.

Total potential energy 

The only method to calculate  for arbitrary conditions is to calculate the total potential energy and differentiate it with respect to the crack surface area. This is typically done by:
 calculating the stress field resulting from the loading,
 calculating the strain energy in the material resulting from the stress field,
 calculating the work done by the external loads,
all in terms of the crack surface area.

Compliance method 
If the material is linearly-elastic, the computation of its energy release rate can be much simplified. In this case, the Load vs. Load-point Displacement curve is linear with a positive slope, and the displacement per unit force applied is defined as the compliance,  
 
The corresponding strain energy  (area under the curve) is equal to 
 
Using the compliance method, one can show that the energy release rate for both cases of prescribed load and displacement come out to be

Multiple specimen methods for nonlinear materials 

In the case of prescribed displacement, holding the crack length fixed, the energy release rate can be computed by 

 

while in the case of prescribed load,

 
As one can see that, in both cases, the energy release rate  times the change in surface  returns the area between curves, which indicates the energy dissipated for the new surface area as illustrated in the right figure

Crack closure integral 
Since the energy release rate is defined as the negative derivative of the total potential energy with respect to crack surface growth, the energy release rate may be written as the difference between the potential energy before and after the crack grows. After some careful derivation, this leads one to the crack closure integral 

where  is the new fracture surface area,  are the components of the traction released on the top fracture surface as the crack grows,  are the components of the crack opening displacement (the difference in displacement increments between the top and bottom crack surfaces), and the integral is over the surface of the material .

The crack closure integral is valid only for elastic materials, but is still valid for cracks that grow in any direction. Nevertheless, for a two-dimensional crack that does indeed grow straight ahead, the crack closure integral simplifies to 

J-integral 

In certain situations, the energy release rate  can be calculated using the 
J-integral, i.e. , using 

This integral is zero over a simple closed path and is path independent, allowing any simple path starting and ending on the crack faces to be used to calculate .
In order to equate the energy release rate to the J-integral, the following conditions must be met:

 the crack must be growing straight ahead, and
 the deformation near the crack (enclosed by ) must be elastic (not plastic).

The J-integral may be calculated with these conditions violated, but then . When they are not violated, one can then relate the energy release rate and the J-integral to the elastic moduli and the stress intensity factors using

Computational methods in fracture mechanics 
A handful of methods exist for calculating  with finite elements. Although a direct calculation of the J-integral is possible (using the strains and stresses outputted by FEA), approximate approaches for some type of crack growth exist and provide reasonable accuracy with straightforward calculations. This section will elaborate on some relatively simple methods for fracture analysis utilizing numerical simulations.

Nodal release method 
If the crack is growing straight, the energy release rate can be decomposed as a sum of 3 terms  associated with the energy in each 3 modes. As a result, the Nodal Release method (NR) can be used to determine  from FEA results. The energy release rate is calculated at the nodes of the finite element mesh for the crack at an initial length and extended by a small distance . First, we calculate the displacement variation at the node of interest (before and after the crack tip node is released). Secondly, we keep track of the nodal force  outputted by FEA. Finally, we can find each components of  using the following formulas:

Where  is the width of the element bounding the crack tip. The accuracy of the method highly depends on the mesh refinement, both because the displacement and forces depend on it, and because . Note that the equations above are derived using the crack closure integral.

If the energy release rate exceed a critical value, the crack will grow. In this case, a new FEA simulation is performed (for the next time step) where the node at the crack tip is released. For a bounded substrate, we may simply stop enforcing fixed Dirichlet boundary conditions at the crack tip node of the previous time step (i.e. displacements are no longer restrained) . For a symmetric crack, we would need to update the geometry of the domain with a longer crack opening (and therefore generate a new mesh).

Modified crack closure integral 
Similar to the Nodal Release Method, the Modified Crack Closure Integral (MCCI) is a method for calculating the energy release rate utilizing FEA nodal displacements  and forces . Where  represents the direction corresponding to the Cartesian basis vectors  with origin at the crack tip, and  represents the nodal index. MCCI is more computationally efficient than the nodal release method because it only requires one analysis for each increment of crack growth.

A necessary condition for the MCCI method is uniform element length  along the crack face in the direction. Additionally, this method requires sufficient discretization such that over the length of one element stress fields are self-similar. This implies that as the crack propagates. Below are examples of the MCCI method with two types of common finite elements.

4-node elements 

The 4-node square linear elements seen in Figure 2 have a distance between nodes  and  equal to  Consider a crack with its tip located at node  Similar to the nodal release method, if the crack were to propagate  one element length along the line of symmetry (parallel to the -axis) the crack opening displacement would be the displacement at the previous crack tip, i.e. and the force at the new crack tip  would be  Since the crack growth is assumed to be self-similar the displacement at node  after the crack propagates is equal to the displacement at node  before the crack propagates.  This same concept can be applied to the forces at node  and  Utilizing the same method shown in the nodal release section we recover the following equations for energy release rate:Where (displacement above and below the crack face respectively). Because we have a line of symmetry parallel to the crack, we can assume 

Thus,

8-node elements 

The 8-node rectangular elements seen in Figure 3 have quadratic basis functions. The process for calculating G is the same as the 4-node elements with the exception that  (the crack growth over one element) is now the distance from node  to  Once again, making the assumption of self-similar straight crack growth the energy release rate can be calculated utilizing with the following equations:Like with the nodal release method the accuracy of MCCI is highly dependent on the level of discretization along the crack tip, i.e.  Accuracy also depends on element choice. A mesh of 8-node quadratic elements can produce more accurate results than a mesh of 4-node linear elements with the same number of degrees of freedom in the mesh.

Domain integral approach for J 

The J-integral may be calculated directly using the finite element mesh and shape functions.

For linear elastic cracks growing straight ahead, . The energy release rate can then be calculated over the area bounded by the contour using an updated formulation:

The formula above may be applied to any annular area surrounding the crack tip (in particular, a set of neighboring elements can be used). This method is very accurate, even with a coarse mesh around the crack tip (one may choose an integration domain located far away, with stresses and displacement less sensitive to mesh refinement)

{| class="toccolours collapsible collapsed" width="80%" style="text-align:left"
!Derivation of the J-integral for domain integral approach
|-
|
The J-intregral may be expressed over the full contour as follow:

With .

Finally, by noting that and using the equilibrium equation:

|}

2-D crack tip singular elements 
The above-mentioned methods for calculating energy release rate asymptotically approach the actual solution with increased discretization, but fail to fully capture the crack tip singularity. More accurate simulations can be preformed by utilizing quarter-point elements around the crack tip. These elements have a built in singularity which more accurately produces stress fields around the crack tip. The advantage of the quarter-point method is that it allows for coarser finite element meshes and greatly reduces computational cost.  Furthermore, these elements are derived from small modifications to common finite elements without requiring special computational programs for analysis. For the purposes of this section elastic materials will be examined, although this method can be extended to elastic-plastic fracture mechanics. Assuming perfect elasticity the stress fields will experience a  crack tip singularity.

8-node isoparametric element 

This results in the following shape functions for the 8-node quadratic elements:When considering a line in front of the crack that is co-linear with the - axis (i.e. )  all basis functions are zero except for Calculating the normal strain involves using the chain rule to take the derivative of displacement with respect to 

If the nodes are spaced evenly on the rectangular element then the strain will not contain the singularity.

Other element types 

The rectangular element method does not allow for singular elements to be easily meshed around the crack tip. This impedes the ability to capture the angular dependence of the stress fields which is critical in determining the crack path. Also, except along the element edges the   singularity exists in a very small region near the crack tip. Figure 6 shows another quarter-point method for modeling this singularity. The 8-node rectangular element can be mapped into a triangle. The collapsed rectangle can more easily surround the crack tip but requires that the element edges be straight or the accuracy of calculating the stress intensity factor will be reduced.

A better candidate for the quarter-point method is the natural triangle as seen in Figure 7. The element's geometry allows for the crack tip to be easily surrounded and meshing is simplified. Following the same procedure described above, the displacement and strain field for the triangular elements are:This method reproduces the first two terms of the Williams solutions with a constant and singular term.

An advantage of quarter-point method is that it can be easily generalized to 3-dimensional models. This can greatly reduce computation when compared to other 3-dimensional methods but can lead to error if that crack tip propagates with a large degree of curvature.

See also
 Fracture mechanics
 Stress intensity factor
 Fracture toughness
J-integral

References

External links
Nonlinear Fracture Mechanics Notes by Prof. John Hutchinson (from Harvard University)
Griffith's Strain Energy Release Rate on www.fracturemechanics.org

Fracture mechanics
Solid mechanics
Mechanics